Chris Butterfield (born 1974-06-26) is a former Arena Football League offensive lineman/defensive lineman for the Portland Forest Dragons (1997–1999), the Oklahoma Wranglers (2000), and the Los Angeles Avengers (2001–2004).

High school career
Butterfield attended Arcata High School in Arcata, California, and was a star in football and wrestling. In football, he was a two-time All-League honoree and was unanimously voted the league's Defensive Player of the Year as a senior. In wrestling, as a senior, he was the county champion and placed tenth in the state.

College career
Butterfield attended Humboldt State University, and was a four-year starter at center and nose guard, and a three-time All-Conference pick. As a senior, he was named the Columbia Football Association’s Offensive Player of the Year. As a junior, he won NCAA Division II All-America honors.

External links
AFL stats

1974 births
Living people
People from Arcata, California
American football defensive linemen
Portland Forest Dragons players
Oklahoma Wranglers players
Los Angeles Avengers players
Humboldt State Lumberjacks football players
Players of American football from California
American football centers